Knock GAA is a Gaelic Athletic Association in Tipperary, Ireland. The club is part of the Mid Tipperary GAA division.

References

External links 
Tipperary GAA site

Gaelic games clubs in County Tipperary